Procopé is a surname. Notable people with the surname include:

Hjalmar Procopé (1889–1954), Finnish politician
Ulla Procopé (1921–1968), Finnish ceramic designer